Frankie Baltazar (born April 14, 1958) is a Mexican American former professional boxer who competed from 1976 to 1991.

Early life
Frankie is the brother of former boxers Robert Baltazar and Tony Baltazar.

The Baltazar brothers were trained and managed by their father, Frank Baltazar Sr.

Professional career
Baltazar unsuccessfully challenged Rafael Limón for the NABF super featherweight title in 1980. On June 17, 1983 he beat title contender Juan Escobar.

See also
Notable boxing families

References

External links

Living people
1958 births
American male boxers
Super-featherweight boxers
Southpaw boxers
American boxers of Mexican descent
Boxers from Los Angeles